Kenneth Earl Starch (born March 5, 1954) is a former American football running back in the National Football League. He played for the Green Bay Packers in 1976. He played at the collegiate level at the University of Wisconsin–Madison. Starch also briefly played for the Oakland Raiders in the National Football League, and the Montreal Alouettes of the Canadian Football League.

References

1954 births
Living people
Sportspeople from Madison, Wisconsin
Players of American football from Wisconsin
American football running backs
Wisconsin Badgers football players
Green Bay Packers players
Madison East High School alumni